Rozenite is a hydrous iron sulfate mineral, Fe2+SO4•4(H2O).

It also occurs in lacustrine sediments and coal seams. Associated minerals include melanterite, epsomite, jarosite, gypsum, sulfur, pyrite, marcasite and limonite.

It was first described in 1960 for an occurrence on Ornak Mountain, Western Tatra Mountains, Małopolskie, Poland. It was named for Polish mineralogist Zygmunt Rozen (1874–1936).

Rozenite exhibits negative linear thermal expansion, meaning that it expands in one direction upon cooling.

References

Sulfate minerals
Iron(II) minerals
Monoclinic minerals
Minerals in space group 14